Digene Corporation was a molecular diagnostics company with company headquarters in Gaithersburg, Maryland, U.S. Floyd Taub, M.D, founded the company in 1984 and it was incorporated in 1985. In 1988, the first diagnostic test for human papillomavirus gained FDA approval; the test was ViraPap, developed by Life Technologies, which had been formed by the merger of GIBCO and Bethesda Research Laboratories in 1983. Clinical uptake was slow, and Life sold the test and associated intellectual property to Digene in 1990. It became Digene's most important product line.

In 2007, Qiagen bought the company for US$1.6 billion.

References

Biotechnology companies of the United States
Defunct companies based in Maryland
Companies based in Gaithersburg, Maryland
Biotechnology companies established in 1984
Biotechnology companies disestablished in 2007
1984 establishments in Maryland
2007 disestablishments in Maryland
2007 mergers and acquisitions